Randy & the Rainbows are an American doo-wop group from Maspeth, New York.

History
The group was formed in 1962 in Maspeth, Queens, and featured two pairs of siblings, along with a fifth member. The Safuto brothers, Dominick and Frank, had previously sung in the group The Dialtones. They recorded with the producers of The Tokens, releasing the single "Denise" in 1963. The name "Randy and the Rainbows" was chosen by the owners of Laurie Records after the group recorded "Denise". The group had previously been called "Junior & the Counts" and "The Encores".

"Denise" spent 17 weeks on the Billboard Hot 100, reaching No. 10, while reaching No. 18 on Billboards "Hot R&B Singles", and No. 5 on Canada's CHUM Hit Parade. The song was written by Neil Levenson, and was inspired by his childhood friend, Denise Lefrak. In the late 1970s, the song became a European hit for Blondie, with the title changed to "Denis". Randy & The Rainbows' follow-up single, "Why Do Kids Grow Up", barely scraped into the pop charts at No. 97, and the group never charted again.

Members
The original 1962 line-up was made up of:
Dominick "Randy" Safuto  (April 19, 1947 – October 16, 2018, aged 71)
Frank Safuto
Mike Zero
Sal Zero (October 10, 1942 - November 19, 2019, aged 77)
Ken Arcipowski (May 26, 1944 – March 23, 2011, aged 66)

Later years
They continued to perform under several other names (Madison Street, Triangle, Them and Us), and toured in subsequent years with The Spinners, Little Anthony and the Imperials, Tony Orlando, Blood, Sweat & Tears, Freddie Roman, Jay Black, Pat Cooper, The Beach Boys, Dionne Warwick, and The Four Seasons. They released a new album, entitled Play Ball, in 2001 on producer Jimmy Wisner's label WizWorks.

Similarly named groups
Two groups now exist carrying the same name, one led by the Safuto brothers (Randy and Frank), the other led by Mike Zero.

Randy Safuto's Randy & The Rainbows
This is made up of the Safuto brothers, members are as follows:
Randy Safuto (died October 16, 2018)
Frank Safuto
Anthony Vara (died December 26, 2016)
Charlie Rocco

The group appeared on the 2001 PBS special Doo Wop 51; it featured Randy's group plus Mike Zero.

Mike Zero's Randy & The Rainbows
This is made up of
Mike Zero
Jack Vitale
Vinny Carella (died 2012)
Jimmy Bense (joined 1990)
Dave Grant
Steve Klein
Bobby Taylor
Barry Titone

Discography

Albums
1982: C'mon Let's Go!
2001: Play Ball

Singles
1960: "Johnny" (as The Dialtones)
1960: "'Till I Heard It from You" (as The Dialtones)
1963: "Angel Face"
1963: "Denise" (US Billboard Hot 100 - No. 10)
1963: "Why Do Kids Grow Up" (US Billboard Hot 100 - No. 97)
1963: "Come Back" 
1963: "Don't Worry, I'm Gonna Make It"
1963: "Dry Your Eyes"
1963: "Happy Teenager" 
1963: "No Love"
1964: "Little Star"
1964: "She's My Angel" 
1964: "Strike It Rich"
1965: "Joyride"
1965: "Little Hot Rod Suzie"
1966: "Bonnie's Part of Town"
1966: "He's a Fugitive"
1966: "I'll Forget Her Tomorrow"
1966: "Lovely Lies"
1966: "Quarter to Three"
1967: "I'll Be Seeing You"
1982: "Debbie"*
1982: "Try the Impossible"
1984: "Remember (Walking in the Sand)"

References

External links
Mike Zero's Randy & The Rainbows
Randy Safuto's Randy & The Rainbows

Doo-wop groups
Musical groups from Queens, New York
Musical groups established in 1962
Laurie Records artists
1962 establishments in New York City